The Bastable Theatre was a theatre in Syracuse, New York, from 1893 to 1923, when it burnt down. First built by Frederick Bastable, Sam S. Shubert began his theatre management at the Bastable in 1897. He and his brothers established The Shubert Organization, which became a major theatre owner. During Shubert's early years of management, he competed with the city's Wieting Opera House, which was controlled by The Theatrical Syndicate. The Bastable itself hosted a number of touring companies in the city and became known for  hosting stock companies and melodramas. The State Tower Building was constructed on the site of the theatre after it burnt down.

Description 
The Bastable Block was six stories and had offices in addition to the theatre. The theatre itself had two balconies and four boxes (two on each side).

History 
The area where the theatre was constructed was occupied by the Bastable block, which had been standing since at least 1852. The block was four stories tall and housed the Shakespeare Hall and arcade. It burnt down on November 20, 1891.

The Bastable Theatre was built by Frederick Bastable in 1893, at a reported cost of $50,000. Archimedes Russell designed the building. It incorporated portions of the walls from the old block that were still standing. In competition with the established Wieting Opera House and Grand Opera House it opened on October 10 that year, with Frank D. Hennessay as its manager. The first show was Beau Brummell starring Richard Mansfield. It was generally unprofitable for the first four years. The theatre had an early success showing the 1897 film The Corbett-Fitzsimmons Fight, on two occasions that year: the first shortly after March, and the second in October. 

Sam S. Shubert took over management on December 14, 1897. Competing with the Wieting, Shubert initially booked "an old-fashioned stock company in old-fashioned plays at old-fashioned prices."  The following year, he diversified the theatre, a move coupled with renovation, and exclusively booked touring shows. The Wieting, controlled by The Theatrical Syndicate, had a virtual monopoly on the biggest names and shows, so Shubert focused on booking a variety of sensational shows and comedies. He began the season with a performance of A Stranger in New York by Charles H. Hoyt.  Shubert showed films by the American Biograph Company to great success beginning in January 1898. 

The theatre was finally successful and profitable, and the Shubert family began leasing both the Bastable and Grand Opera House in the city. They quickly expanded across New York state. The Shuberts created The Shubert Organization, which became a major theatre owner. The Bastable grew to be known for hosting stock companies and melodramas. In 1902 Hurtig & Seamon became managers. By 1908 they were succeeded by Syracuse's General Amusement Company.

1923 fire 
On February 12, 1923, the Bastable Theatre caught fire and burnt down. At the time, it had about 150 tenants. The fire was noted around 5:30 pm, but the top of the building was engulfed in flame before effective firefighting could begin. They focused their efforts on rescuing people. The fire resulted in three deaths and $1.5 million damages. Several other buildings caught fire, and the Bastable block was virtually completely razed. Syracuse revised its fire response policies in the fire's aftermath. Several months after burning down, the owner of the block announced construction of a new office building on the lot. It became the State Tower Building, Syracuse's tallest building.

References

Bibliography
 
 
 

Theatres in New York (state)
Theatres completed in 1893
Burned theatres
1923 fires in the United States